Zamir may refer to:

 Zamir (name), a given name and surname in various languages
 Zameer (1975 film), a 1975 Hindi film
 Zameer: The Awakening of a Soul, 1997 film
 Zameer: The Fire Within, 2005 film

Others 
 Zamir Jaffri Cricket Stadium, Jhelum, Pakistan
 Zamir Chorale of Boston, a choral group founded in 1969